More Experience is the second live album that was issued of the performance by the Jimi Hendrix Experience at the Royal Albert Hall in London on February 24, 1969. Released in March 1972 in the United Kingdom by Ember Records, it was promoted as a soundtrack to a film documenting the performance. However, legal difficulties prevented release of the film and the complete soundtrack.

Accompanied by incorrect liner notes, it features two highly edited recordings that appeared on the previous Ember release, Experience, plus two tracks that had been already released  on Hendrix in the West (1972), and three others.

Track listing

Personnel
The Jimi Hendrix Experience
 Jimi Hendrixguitar, vocals
 Mitch Mitchelldrums
 Noel Reddingbass guitar

Additional musicians on "Room Full of Mirrors"
 Chris Woodflute 
 Dave Masonguitar

References

Live albums published posthumously
Jimi Hendrix live albums
1972 live albums
Live albums recorded at the Royal Albert Hall